Chemical Physics is a peer-reviewed scientific journal of physical chemistry. The journal was established in 1973 and is published by Elsevier on a monthly basis. The current editors are Mischa Bonn, Tianquan Lian, and Yi Luo.

Indexing and abstracting
The journal is indexed and abstracted in the following bibliographic databases:

References

External links

Chemistry journals
Physics journals
Elsevier academic journals
English-language journals
Monthly journals
Publications established in 1973